Robert Bostock (1743, Tarvin – 24 September 1793, Liverpool) was an English slave trader,  who was born in Tarvin, Cheshire. He was held to be a "very considerable African merchant". His letterbooks for the period 1779-92 have been found to be very useful for historians researching the slave trade of that era. They provide information about his prolific career. Which is ironic as his family tree now includes two mixed race Aboriginal branches.

Early life
Robert was the son of Peter Bostock, a joiner living in Tarvin and his wife Elizabeth, née Blease, who died shortly after Robert's birth. His father remarried two years later. However his second wife, Ann, also died, in 1748.

Slave trader in Liverpool
Robert married Elizabeth Wilkinson in Tarvin in 1770 and by 1772 was living in Liverpool. He joined the congregation of St Anne's Church, Liverpool, occupying three pews. Charles Wilkinson was related to him and worked as his agent in London before settling on the Rio Pongo. Richard Bostock maintained correspondence with him there.

Slave trading voyages
The information here is based on "Robert Bostock of Liverpool and the British Slave Trade on the Upper Guinea Coast, 1769-93" by Denise Jones. She uses the Voyage ids from the Slave Voyages database which she has collated with Bostock's Letterbook. The one exception from 1792 does not appear on the database.

 1786: Bostock purchased the schooner , of 86 tons (bm) which he then captained. They departed Liverpool on 3 April 1786. He acquired an estimated 161 enslaved Africans on the Windward Coast. He transported the captives to Antigua, where he arrived with 150.

References

1743 births
1793 deaths
English slave traders